Grace Communion International (GCI), formerly named the Radio Church of God and the Worldwide Church of God, is a Christian denomination with 30,000 members in about 550 churches spread across 70 countries. The denomination is structured in the episcopal model based in Charlotte, North Carolina, US, and is a member of the National Association of Evangelicals.

Origins 
The Radio Church of God was founded in 1934 in Eugene, Oregon, by radio- and televangelist Herbert W. Armstrong as a radio ministry that promoted a strict, minimalist doctrine. In 1947, the church relocated its headquarters to Ambassador College in Pasadena, California, also founded by Armstrong; in 1968 the movement was renamed the Worldwide Church of God (WCG). Armstrong, who predicted that the world might end in 1975, required that members observe the Sabbath, forbade medical interventions, and often required three tithes. As WCG, the church developed a reputation as a "doomsday cult".

Armstrong died in 1986 and was succeeded by Joseph W. Tkach Sr. Tkach and other ministers  came to the conclusion that a great many of their doctrines were not biblical. In 1995, after his father's death, Joseph Tkach Jr. became the leader of the WCG affirming the prior reforms within the church and continuing change as old doctrines were scrutinized. As a result, many members and ministers left and formed other churches that conformed to many of the teachings of Armstrong. In 2009, the church changed its name from the Worldwide Church of God to Grace Communion International.

In October 2018 Joe Tkach Jr. retired and installed Greg Williams as the President of GCI. Williams became a member of the Grace Communion International Board of Directors and the National Association of Evangelicals (NAE) Board of Directors.

Beliefs and practices

Teachings
The GCI's doctrinal summary highlights mainstream Protestant beliefs such as the death and resurrection of Jesus Christ, that faith in him is the only way to receive salvation, and that the Bible is the divinely inspired and infallible word of God.

Historical teachings under Armstrong

Grace Communion International separated itself from the doctrines of Armstrong. The Worldwide Church of God adhered to the teachings of its founder, Herbert  W. Armstrong, until his death. Armstrong rejected the doctrine of the Trinity, regarding it as a pagan concept that had been absorbed into mainstream Christianity. Armstrong considered that God was not a closed Trinity, but was instead building a family through the Holy Spirit, which Armstrong considered to be God's powerful unifying essence guiding and bringing to remembrance those things which Christ taught. Armstrong contended that the Spirit is not a distinct person like the Father and the Son. Armstrong also taught that members of the church would actually become members of the God family themselves after the resurrection. Armstrong rejected as unbiblical the traditional Christian views of Heaven, Hell, eternal punishment and salvation.

The church strictly observed the Saturday Sabbath, annual festivals and holy days described in the twenty-third chapter of Leviticus, and strongly advocated the distinction between the flesh of clean and unclean animals listed in Leviticus 11. Members were encouraged to tithe and to follow a dress code during services. They were discouraged from marrying outside the church. These practices are still observed in several of the Church's remaining branches. Armstrong summarized his teachings in his book Mystery of the Ages, published shortly before his death. This book was the centerpiece of a struggle between the Philadelphia Church of God and the remnant of the Worldwide Church of God under Joseph Tkach Jr which went as far as the United States Supreme Court. At that point, however, the leaders of the WCG decided to drop the case and give over not only the book Mystery of the Ages, but also several other works originally written by Armstrong.

Under Armstrong's leadership, the Worldwide Church of God was accused of being a pseudo-Christian cult with unorthodox and, to most Christians, heretical teachings. Critics also contended that the WCG did not proclaim salvation by grace through faith alone, but rather required works as part of salvation. The late Walter Martin, in The Kingdom of the Cults, devoted 34 pages to the group, saying that Armstrong borrowed freely from Seventh-day Adventist, Jehovah's Witnesses and Mormon doctrines. Armstrong said that all Church doctrine could be proven simply and effectively through the Bible, and that one did not need to "accept one faith" any of the Worldwide Church of God's doctrinal beliefs.

History

Beginnings
The Radio Church of God began with Herbert W. Armstrong, who in 1931 was ordained by the Oregon Conference of the Church of God (Seventh Day), an Adventist group, and began serving a congregation in Eugene, Oregon. On January 7, 1934, Armstrong began hosting a broadcast on a local 100-watt radio station KORE in Eugene. It was essentially a condensed church service on the air, with hymn singing featured along with Armstrong's message, and it was the launching point for what would become the Radio Church of God. In 1933, the Church of God (Seventh Day) split. Armstrong, who sided with the faction centered in Salem, West Virginia, fell out with the local congregation over various doctrinal issues, especially his espousal of British Israelism.

Although his views were rejected by the local congregation, he gained a growing following of his own, chiefly through his World Tomorrow broadcasts and The Plain Truth magazine. Armstrong moved to Pasadena, California. To facilitate the work of the growing church, he incorporated it on March 3, 1946, as the Radio Church of God. In 1947, Ambassador College was founded in Pasadena by the church, and the campus served as the church's headquarters.

The broadcast of The World Tomorrow went into Europe on Radio Luxembourg on January 7, 1953. In 1956, Armstrong published the booklet 1975 in Prophecy!, which predicted an upcoming nuclear war and subsequent enslavement of mankind, leading to the return of Jesus Christ. He explained that the book was written to contrast the spiritual condition of the world with the modern inventions that scientists were promising for the year 1975.

In 1971 Armstrong criticized teachings that Christ would return in 1975 and that the church should flee to a "place of safety" in 1972, as no man knew the time of Christ's return (Matthew 24:36 and 25:13). Armstrong wrote that 1975 could not possibly be the year of Christ's return.

Because of his strong emphasis on these prophetic dates, the church grew quickly in the late 1960s and, on January 5, 1968, was renamed the Worldwide Church of God.

Armstrong's son, Garner Ted Armstrong, who had been given the responsibility to host the radio and later the television version of The World Tomorrow, was formally disfellowshipped by his father in 1972. While church members were told at the time that the reason was Ted Armstrong's opposition to some of his father's teachings, Ted Armstrong later admitted that the actual reason was his relationships with many women. Herbert Armstrong, who resumed the broadcasting duties of The World Tomorrow program, did not reconcile with Ted before his death.

Armstrong explained that those "called" by God, who believed the gospel of the Kingdom, and received God's Spirit upon full-immersion baptism, became part of the true, biblical, 'Church of God'.  Other churches with different doctrines, such as a three personage 'Trinity', were taught as being Satanic counterfeits.  Ministers had the duty of responsibility to disfellowship any in their congregations who caused trouble or division. Any such disfellowshipments were announced at services, so the congregation as a whole became aware. Still the church grew on a worldwide scale.

Armstrong taught the doctrine of tithing. Ten percent of a member's gross income was to be given to the church, then another ten percent was to be saved for personal expenditures incurred by attendance at the annual holy day celebration 'the Feast of Tabernacles'. Every third year, members gave an additional tithe to help "widows and orphans" of the church. Seven high holy days were celebrated throughout the year, on which members gave offerings in baskets passed. Every month Herbert Armstrong would write and mail out a 'co-worker' letter to members and non-members supportive of the work of the Church, through their donations. Church headquarters and  Ambassador College were located in Pasadena, California, on prime real estate. Armstrong's mansion was alongside Orange Grove Boulevard, which is part of the route of Pasadena's annual New Year's Day 'Rose Parade'. The church possessed several mansions in that area, known as Millionaire's Row, and had built other large facilities on the thirty-acre property. Among these was the Ambassador Auditorium, now the resident home of the Pasadena Symphony.

Armstrong spared no expense in the building of his auditorium. Its external walls were made of emerald onyx. Walls in the outer lobby were made of a rare pink onyx, and beautiful candelabras and chandeliers were on display, including two that had been owned by the Shah of Iran, hung from the gilt ceilings. Inside the concert hall, acoustically-designed side walls were made of rosewood.

1970s
Sixteen years before Armstrong died, in 1970, there began a splintering away from the church. A group led by Carl O'Beirn of Cleveland, Ohio may have been the first to leave. Others followed, including John Kerley's Top of the Line Ministry in 1978; the Restoration Church of God; the Church of God (Boise City) in Boise City, Oklahoma; Marvin Faulhaber's Sabbatarian, a group also known as Church of God (Sabbatarian); and the Fountain of Life Fellowship of James and Virginia Porter. These factions survived well past Herbert Armstrong's death in 1986, most retaining the name Church of God because Armstrong had pointed out that this is the name God calls his Church in the Bible.

When the fall of 1972 came and the time to flee to a place of safety did not occur, there was yet another exodus of members who had had expectations yet became disillusioned. Armstrong began to more urgently preach the gospel of the Kingdom, around the world.  He set about doing that, with the help of some public relations aides and King Leopold of Belgium. Armstrong did end up meeting with many world leaders to whom he would, appropriately, present expensive gifts, then preached to them simplistically, how that there were "two ways" of life, – one, of giving and the other - the way of getting.

Ambassador International Cultural Foundation
During the 1960s, "Armstrong had sought to put into stronger action what he later termed God's way of give". To Armstrong and his students, this was generally said to include "the way of character, generosity, cultural enrichment, true education: of beautifying the environment and caring for fellow man." He began undertaking humanitarian projects in underprivileged locales around the world, which sparked the creation of the church-run Ambassador International Cultural Foundation (AICF) in 1975. The Foundation's efforts reached into several countries, providing staffing and funds to fight illiteracy, to create schools for the disabled, to set up mobile schools, and to conduct several archaeological digs at significant biblical sites. The church auditorium hosted, at highly subsidized ticket prices, hundreds of performances by noted artists such as Luciano Pavarotti, Vladimir Horowitz, Bing Crosby, Marcel Marceau, and Bob Hope. Nevertheless, ticket sales could still not pay for the appearances of world-renowned performers, so Armstrong used church tithe money to subsidize these performances without informing his congregation of how "God's holy tithe" was being spent.

Quest was a periodical that was published monthly by AICF from July 1977 to September 1981. Originally published under the title Human Potential, the project was directed by Stanley Rader as a secular outreach of the church-funded AICF. Quest publishers hired a professional staff unrelated to the church to create a high-quality, glossy publication devoted to the humanities, travel, and the arts. The original name and design of Human Potential were conceived in the aftermath of Armstrong's poorly received 1975 in Prophecy!, a publication which caused accusations of false prophecy to spread like wildfire. (The use of the year 1975 was defended by church ministers as a device to explain biblical prophecy, by contrasting it with the scientific world's declaration of 1975 as the year of technological "Utopia").

The AICF had become secular in its approach and thinking. Thus, the church began to cut back on its funding. Eventually, because the AICF was perceived to have strayed from its original goals, it was discontinued by Armstrong and its assets were sold to other interests.

Scandal and conflict
Many members were disappointed that the events predicted in biblical prophecy, expounded and preached about by Herbert Armstrong, had not yet come to pass. Most were unaware that Herbert Armstrong had been preaching about Revelation and Bible Prophecy on the radio as far back as World War II. Because church literature such as The Wonderful World Tomorrow, 1975 in Prophecy!, and many others had attempted to pinpoint the date of Christ's return, members continued to wait anxiously for the Second Coming. Armstrong never predicted a date in his sermons, nor did any of his evangelists. Some (such as Gerald Waterhouse) presented detailed, step-by-step accounts of the Second Coming in their sermons, which included Armstrong himself as one of two witnesses of the Book of Revelation.

Herbert Armstrong began to speak openly and critically of his son. Garner Ted spoke of greatly expanding the church's media ministry on the model of the Church of Christ, Scientist with its widely read Christian Science Monitor to which Herbert W. Armstrong disagreed.

In a report in the May 15, 1972, edition of Time magazine, Herbert Armstrong was reported to have said that Garner Ted was "in the bonds of Satan." The elder Armstrong did not elaborate, but it was speculated that Herbert was alluding to Garner Ted's alleged problems with gambling and adultery with Ambassador College co-eds, and to serious doctrinal differences. Garner Ted Armstrong was soon relieved of his star role within the church.

While Garner Ted Armstrong was removed, Stanley Rader was orchestrating the church's involvement in a number of corporations which Rader and Herbert W. Armstrong  had established. Critics saw Rader's moves as an attempt to seize control of the church. Rader characterized his involvement as that of an adviser and claimed that his advice was opening doors for Armstrong that a strict theological role would not have allowed for. Herbert Armstrong claimed that he did not approve of the establishment of the AICF, which Rader set up ostensibly to give the elder Armstrong a role as the "Ambassador for World Peace without portfolio".

Despite the scandals of 1972, the church continued to grow in the 1970s, with Herbert Armstrong still at the helm. In 1975, Armstrong baptized Stanley Rader, who until then had been a practitioner of Judaism despite his association with the church.

After being left a widower by the death of his wife, Loma, eleven years earlier, Armstrong married Ramona Martin, a woman nearly fifty years younger, in 1977 and moved to Tucson, Arizona while recovering from a heart attack. While Armstrong recuperated in his home in Arizona, he administered and guided church affairs through Stanley Rader and the church administration. The church continued to be headquartered in Pasadena.

Garner Ted Armstrong began his own church in 1978 in Tyler, Texas, after the rivalry between the younger Armstrong and Stanley Rader intensified. As the accusations of Garner Ted's past resurfaced, Herbert W. Armstrong started giving more responsibilities to Stanley Rader. This action was infuriating to the younger Armstrong, who thought it his birthright to take over as the leader of the Church. The adultery problems that reportedly had previously driven Garner Ted from the church allegedly continued unabated. In 1978, after a failed attempt to seize control of the Church from the Elder Armstrong, Garner Ted Armstrong was disfellowshipped a final time. Garner Ted moved to Tyler, Texas, and there founded a splinter group, the Church of God International.

About this time the gap between father and son was set when Garner Ted threatened to expose the secret of Herbert's molesting his sister in the later 1930s. 

A coalition of six ex-ministers brought accusations of misappropriation of funds directed against Herbert W. Armstrong and Stanley Rader to the Attorney General of California. Contending that Herbert W. Armstrong and Stanley Rader were siphoning millions of dollars for their personal indulgences, the Attorney General's office seized the Pasadena Campus. This action by the State of California was later dismissed and determined by the presiding Judge to have been illegal.

Receivership crisis
Garner Ted Armstrong blamed Stanley Rader for his two-time ousting from his father's church. Several members in good standing with the Worldwide Church of God at the time prompted the State of California to investigate charges of malfeasance by Rader and Herbert W. Armstrong. In 1979, California Attorney General George Deukmejian placed the church campus in Pasadena into financial receivership for a half year. The State of California went through the church's records.

The matter gained the attention of Mike Wallace who investigated the church in a report for 60 Minutes. Wallace alleged that there had been lavish secret expenditures, conflict of interest insider deals, posh homes and lifestyles in the higher ranks, and the heavy involvement of Stanley Rader in financial manipulation. No legal charges were leveled against Herbert W. Armstrong, Stanley Rader, or the Worldwide Church of God. Wallace invited Rader to appear on 60 Minutes on April 15, 1979. Wallace showed Rader a secret tape recording in which Herbert Armstrong clearly stated to C. Wayne Cole, who was made temporary acting head of the church by Herbert Armstrong, that Rader was attempting to take over the church after Armstrong's death, reasoning that the donated tithe money was the incentive and quite a "magnet" to Stan Rader. Rader abruptly ended the interview. This tape was made during a conversation about Stanley Rader by Herbert W. Armstrong, and C. Wayne Cole. Wayne Cole gave the tape to 60 Minutes for use in its exposé of Rader.

In the meantime, Herbert W. Armstrong switched the Worldwide Church of God Inc. corporations to "corporate sole" status, making him the sole officer and responsible party for the affairs of the corporations. All income, tithes and checks were then made payable to the personal name of Herbert W. Armstrong and sent to his home in Tucson, Arizona.

In referring to the investigation of the California Attorney General, Rader wrote Against the Gates of Hell: The Threat to Religious Freedom in America in 1980, in which he contended that his fight with the Attorney General was solely about the government's circumventing religious freedoms rather than about abuse of public trust or fraudulent misappropriation of tithe funds.

The California Second Court of Appeals overturned the decision on procedural grounds and added as dicta, "We are of the opinion that the underlying action [i.e., the state-imposed receivership] and its attendant provisional remedy of receivership were from the inception constitutionally infirm and predestined to failure."

Stanley Rader left his positions within the church in 1981. While remaining a member, he left the public spotlight as an attorney, retired, but continued to receive payments from The Worldwide Church of God on his lifetime contract, $300,000 per year, until his death from acute pancreatic cancer on July 2, 2002.

Armstrong's death and doctrinal changes
On January 16, 1986, Herbert Armstrong died in Pasadena, California. Shortly before his death, on January 7, Armstrong appointed Joseph W. Tkach Sr. to succeed him "... as pastor general, in the difficult times ahead".

As early as 1988, Joseph W. Tkach Sr. began to make doctrinal changes, at first quietly and slowly, but then openly and radically in January 1995. The doctrinal changes were presented as new understandings of Christmas and Easter, Babylon and the harlot, British Israelism, Saturday Sabbath, and other doctrines.

In general, Tkach Sr. directed the church theology towards mainstream evangelical Christian belief, against the wishes of some of the membership. That caused much disillusionment among the membership and another rise of splinter groups. All the changes, the church admitted, had organizationally brought about "catastrophic results," though they believe that it is spiritually the best thing that ever happened to them. During the tenure of Joseph Tkach Sr., the church's membership declined by 80 percent. In 1995, Tkach Sr died of cancer shortly after introducing the changes, and his son, Joseph Tkach Jr., succeeded him.

All of Herbert Armstrong's writings were withdrawn from print by the Worldwide Church of God though they are still made available by other denominations. In the 2004 video production Called To Be Free, Greg Albrecht, former dean of WCG's Ambassador College, declared Herbert Armstrong to be both a false prophet and a heretic.

Women's ordination
In 2007 the Worldwide Church of God decided to allow women to serve as pastors and elders. This decision was reached after several years of study. Debby Bailey became the first female elder in the Worldwide Church of God in 2007.

Name change to Grace Communion International 
The change to the name Grace Communion International was chosen carefully to best reflect what the denomination had become:

“An international community, bound together by God's grace.”

The name change was first revealed during a conference of over a thousand ministers and their spouses that had gathered from around the world. The theme of the conference “Renewed in Christ” reflected the importance of the changes that had occurred within the church due to the Grace of God and gave recognition to the source of those changes.  With members from around the world gathered together in understanding of the transformative grace of God the new name for the church was seen to truly reflect the nature of the church as it had been transformed in past years as GCI felt led by the Holy Spirit with a close examination of scripture.

Grace Communion Seminary 
Grace Communion Seminary (GCS) sprang from the roots of Ambassador College a liberal arts Christian college in California and associated colleges in Texas and England. Since then, the physical locations closed, classes moved to an online format and the undergraduate program and graduate program were separated.

Currently the accredited graduate programs are conducted as Grace Communion Seminary including courses in Bible, theology, church history, and ministry. Programs are available online for those who are academically qualified and want to expand their education and ministry in the evangelical tradition.

The goal of GCS is to provide quality graduate level education for those Christians who want to grow closer to our Triune God and serve more effectively in the Incarnational life of the church in Jesus Christ.

GCS teaches from the perspective of Incarnational Trinitarian Theology, equipping the universal church for pastoral ministry to share the love of God with the world.

Structure

International
Grace Communion International has a hierarchical polity. Its ecclesiastical policies are determined by the Advisory Council of Elders. Members of the Advisory Council are appointed by the President. The President, who also holds the title of Pastor General, is chief executive and ecclesiastical officer of the denomination. A Doctrinal Advisory Team may report to the Advisory Council on the church's official doctrinal statements, epistemology, or apologetics. The President may pocket veto doctrinal positions he determines to be heretical. However, the President is also a member of the Doctrinal Advisory Team, and so he is aware of and involved in the activities of that committee. Historically, Presidents, as chairmen of the board of directors, have appointed their own successor. This and the President's power to appoint and remove members of the Advisory Council have remained areas of concern even among those who applaud the church's doctrinal changes.

The Church maintains national offices and satellite offices in multiple countries. Membership and tithe income originate primarily from the eastern United States.

Regional and local
In the United States, denominational contact with local assemblies or local church home small group meetings, i.e., cell churches, is facilitated by district superintendents, each of which is responsible for a large number of churches in a geographical region (such as Florida or the Northeast) or in a specialized language group (such as Spanish-speaking congregations).

Local churches are led by a senior pastor, pastoral leadership team (with one person designated as a congregational pastoral leader), each of which is supervised by a district pastoral leader. Some senior pastors are responsible for a single local church, but many are responsible for working in two or more churches. Salary compensation for the paid local church pastor, if available, is determined by the local church.

Most local church groups retain the long-standing traditional policy of meeting in leased or rented facilities for meetings or services. The trend since 2000, however, has been to adopt a local church setting blending into the local milieu with headquarters retaining administrative oversight functions. As of 2005, the church established a new computer system of financial checks and balances for church budgets at the local level. Also, GCI now mandates a local Advisory Council, which includes a number of volunteer ministry leaders (some of whom are also called deacons), and often additional elders or assistant pastors.

Finances
The early Worldwide Church of God used a three-tithe system, under which members were expected to give a tithe or ten percent "of their increase", usually interpreted as a family's income.
The first tithe, 10 percent of a member's total income, was sent to church headquarters to finance "the work", which was all operations of the church, as well as broadcasting and publishing the church's message.
The second tithe was saved by the individual member to fund the member's (and his family's) observance of the annual holy days, especially the 8-day-long Feast of Tabernacles. Unlike the first tithe, these funds were not sent into the church but retained by the member.
A third tithe was required in the third and sixth years of a personal seven-year tithing cycle, and it was also sent to headquarters. The third tithe was used to support the indigent, widows, and orphans - distribution was decided privately at the discretion of the ministry.

In contrast to many other churches' religious services, the practice of the WCG was not to pass around offering plates during weekly church services but only during holy day church services (seven days each year). These funds were considered "freewill offerings" and regarded as entirely separate from regular tithes. The church also gathered funds in the form of donations from "co-workers," those who read the church's free literature or watched the weekly TV show but did not actually attend services.

Under Joseph W. Tkach Sr., the mandatory nature of the church's three-tithe system was abolished, and it was suggested that tithes could be calculated on net, rather than gross, income. Today, the GCI headquarters has downsized for financial survival. The denomination sold much of its property, including sites used for festivals, camps built for teenagers, college campuses, and private aircraft. They discontinued publishing all the books, booklets and magazines published by Armstrong.

To further economize, the church sold its properties in Pasadena and purchased an office building in Glendora, California. That building was sold in 2018 and the home office was moved to Charlotte, North Carolina. Formerly, the church's membership—meeting in rented halls on Saturdays such as public school buildings, dance halls, hotels and other venues—sent all tithe donations directly to the denomination. Under the new financial reporting system, local churches typically use the majority of funds locally for ministry, including buying or constructing local church buildings for use by the congregations with around 15% going to the denominational office; depending on how the congregation is affiliated with the denomination.

References

Citations

Sources
Frank S. Mead, Samuel S. Hill, and Craig D. Atwood, Handbook of Denominations in the United States. Abingdon Press, 2001. .
J. Michael Feazell, The Liberation of the Worldwide Church of God. Zondervan, 2003. .
Gerald Flurry, Malachi's Message to God's Church Today. "A thorough explanation of how and why the Worldwide Church of God rejected Herbert Armstrong's teachings, and how to hold fast to Herbert Armstrong's teachings."
Walter Martin, The Kingdom of the Cults. Revised and Updated Edition, Bethany House, 2003. . See Appendix A, pp. 471–494.
Larry Nichols and George Mather, Discovering the Plain Truth: How the Worldwide Church of God Encountered the Gospel of Grace. InterVarsity Press, 1998. 
Joseph Tkach, Transformed by Truth. Multnomah Publishers, 1997. 
https://web.archive.org/web/20080411223415/http://etext.lib.virginia.edu/relmove/nrms/philcog.html

External links
 Grace Communion International
Statement of beliefs
Archive of the Ambassador Report publication published from 1975 through 1999
Exit & Support Network – aiding those spiritually abused by Worldwide Church of God and offshoots
God's Work NOW Holding fast to the teachings of Herbert W. Armstrong
Bad News Religion: The Virus That Attacks God's Grace by Greg Albrecht, World Publishing (2004),
The Journal: News of the Churches of God independent non-denominational monthly newspaper
Word of His Grace Ministries Support and Biblical Backing for ex-'Armstrong' members
"Called to be Free" Documenting how the doctrinal changes in WWCG occurred after Armstrong's death, from the point of view of current WWCG leadership

1934 establishments in Oregon
2009 establishments in California
Christian organizations established in 1934
Christian organizations established in 2009
Christian mass media in the United States
Christian radio
Christianity in Los Angeles
 
Church of God denominations
Evangelical denominations established in the 20th century
Evangelical denominations in North America
Glendora, California
Members of the National Association of Evangelicals
Organizations based in Los Angeles County, California
Televangelism